Amphionthe caudalis is a species of beetle in the family Cerambycidae. It was described by Schwarzer in 1929.

References

Trachyderini
Beetles described in 1929